Elections to Trafford Council were held on 2 May 2002. One third of the council was up for election, with each successful candidate to serve a two-year term of office, expiring in 2004, due to the boundary changes and 'all-out' elections due to take place that year. The Labour Party retained overall control of the council. Overall turnout was 52.3%.

After the election, the composition of the council was as follows:

Summary

Ward results

2002 English local elections
2002
2000s in Greater Manchester